Fatehpur is a village in Singhpur block of Rae Bareli district, Uttar Pradesh, India. As of 2011, its population is 5,348, in 856 households.

The 1961 census recorded Fatehpur as comprising 9 hamlets, with a total population of 1,545 people (799 male and 746 female), in 345 households and 316 physical houses.
 The area of the village was given as 981 acres and it had a post office at that point.

The 1981 census recorded Fatehpur as having a population of 2,510 people, in 480 households, and having an area of 396.60 hectares.

References

Villages in Raebareli district